Laderazi (also Romanized as Lāderāzī; also known as Chahsmen Ali, Chashmeh-i-‘Ali, Cheshmeh ‘Alī, and Cheshmeh ‘Alī Mūchkān) is a village in Jahangiri Rural District, in the Central District of Masjed Soleyman County, Khuzestan Province, Iran. 

According to 2006 census, its population was 49, in 11 families.

References 

Populated places in Masjed Soleyman County